Jørgen Vagn Pedersen (born 8 October 1959 in Copenhagen, Hovedstaden) is a retired Danish road bicycle racer, and as of 2007 sports director at Team CSC.

He participated in Tour de France in 1985, 1986, and 1987 for the  team. In 1988 he rode the tour for BH. In 1985 he won the 10th stage. In 1986 he rode, as the second Dane, five days in the yellow jersey. In 1986 he was second overall in the stage race Danmark Rundt.

He also competed at the 1980 Summer Olympics and the 1984 Summer Olympics.

Major results

1981
 national amateur road race champion
1985
Tour de France:
Winner stage 10
1986
Tour de France:
Wearing yellow jersey for five days
1988
Klasika Primavera

References

External links 

1959 births
Living people
Danish male cyclists
Danish Tour de France stage winners
Cyclists at the 1980 Summer Olympics
Cyclists at the 1984 Summer Olympics
Olympic cyclists of Denmark
Cyclists from Copenhagen